Phaeoura is a genus of moths in the family Geometridae.

Species include:
Phaeoura cristifera
Phaeoura kirkwoodi
Phaeoura mexicanaria - pine looper
Phaeoura perfidaria
Phaeoura quernaria - oak beauty

References

Ennominae